{{Infobox sportsperson
| name = Kamalpreet Kaur Bal
| image =
| nationality = Indian
| birth_date = 
| birth_place = Kabarwala, Sri Muktsar Sahib, Punjab, India
| country = 
| education = 
| sport = Track and field
| event = Discus throw
| coach = Rakhi Tyagi
| pb = 66.59m  (2021) NR
}}Kamalpreet Kaur''' (born 4 March 1996) is an Indian Athlete from Punjab. She is the first Indian woman to breach the 65m barrier in discus throw. She is supported by GoSports Foundation through the Rahul Dravid Athlete Mentorship Programme. Her best performance came when she finished 6th in discus throw at Tokyo 2020.

Kaur set a national record in discus throw with an attempt of 65.06 m and qualified for the summer Olympics in Tokyo. She extended her record to 66.59m at the Indian Grand Prix-4 at the NIS, Patiala, on 21 June 2021.

On 12th October 2022, she was banned from competing for a period of three years by the AIU for a doping violation.

Childhood and early Career 
Kamalpreet hails from Kabar Wala, Malout, a village in the Sri Muktsar Sahib District of Punjab. On the insistence of her physical education coach, she took up athletics in 2012 and finished fourth at her first state meet. Kaur started taking the sport seriously in 2014 and began her initial training at the Sports Authority of India (SAI) centre in her village. Her rigorous practice and natural ability soon began to yield results as she became the U-18 and U-20 national champion in 2016. Later, in 2017, she finished sixth at the 29th World University Games.

Tournament and Medals 
At the Asian Athletics Championships held in Doha in 2019, she finished fifth, and clinched the gold at the 2019 Federation Cup Senior Athletics Championship with a throw of 60.25m. She made history at the 24th Federation Cup Senior Athletics Championships, when she became the first Indian woman to breach the 65m barrier in discus throw, and finished at the top of the podium second time in a row.

With national record breaking throw of 65.06m at the 24th Federation Cup Senior Athletics Championships in Patiala, she qualified for the Tokyo Olympics.

Personal life 

Kamalpreet is employed with the Indian Railways.She had studied in Punjabi University. She looks at Seema Punia as one of her idols, and currently trains under Rakhi Tyagi. She has stated that she loves cricket and aspires to participate in the National women's cricket team in future.

International competitions

References

Living people
Indian female discus throwers
1996 births
People from Patiala district
Athletes (track and field) at the 2020 Summer Olympics
Olympic athletes of India